Souvik Maiti (born in 1971) is an Indian chemist known for his studies in the fields of biophysical chemistry and chemical biology focusing on nucleic acids, DNA and RNA. He works at the Institute of Genomics and Integrative Biology. He is also visiting scientist at National Chemical Laboratory Pune.

He graduated with a Bachelor (1993) and Master (1995) degree in Chemistry from Jadavpur University, Kolkata. He completed his doctoral research in 1999 in the field of Polymer Chemistry from CSIR-Indian Institute of Chemical Technology, Hyderabad.

He is known for his studies on biophysical aspect of quadruplexes, locked nucleic acids. He is also known for his work on silencing microRNAs by small molecules. His group has invented nucleic acid based enzyme as silencers for microRNA, known as antagomirzymes.Antagomirzymes: oligonucleotide enzymes that specifically silence microRNA function He is recipient of CSIR, NASI-Scopus, CDRI, AVRA Young Scientist Awards and Shanti Swarup Bhatnagar Award in Chemistry, Shanti Swarup Bhatnagar awards in 2014., National Bioscience Award for Career Development of the Department of Biotechnology in 2015. in Biology, as well as Swarnajayanti Fellowships in Biological Sciences. He is fellow of Indian Academy of Sciences, Bangalore and Indian National Academy of Science, Delhi.

Along with his colleague,   Debojyoti Chakraborty, he has co-invented a rapid test for COVID-19, FnCas9 Editor-Linked Uniform Detection Assay, FELUDA. (named after Feluda, a popular fictional detective created by the late Satyajit Ray.) Tata Sons has obtained license from CSIR for commercial launch of this test. Tata group has established a new company, TATA MD and launched this test as a brand name "TATA MD Check". In 2021, CSIR and Tata MD partner to ramp up Covid testing capacity across tier 2, 3 towns and rural areas.

References 

https://economictimes.indiatimes.com/industry/healthcare/biotech/healthcare/csir-tata-md-partner-to-ramp-up-covid-testing-capacity-across-tier-2-3-towns-and-rural-areas/articleshow/83636670.cms

External links 
 Souvik Maiti's Home Profile

1971 births
20th-century Indian chemists
Living people
Place of birth missing (living people)
Jadavpur University
Jadavpur University alumni
N-BIOS Prize recipients
Scientists from West Bengal